Too Much Too Young: The Gold Collection is a compilation album by British Ska band The Specials. It features eight songs from their eponymous 1979 debut album Specials, along with seven songs from the subsequent More Specials album (1980), plus the track Rude Boys Outa Jail, originally only released as a double A-side single with Rat Race in 1980.

The compilation thus focuses on the earlier years of the group, only featuring recordings made by the original line-up before Neville Staples, Terry Hall and Lynval Golding left the band in 1981/1982. A notable omission is the group's second (and last) number one hit Ghost Town, released as a single in 1981, while Staples, Hall and Golding were still in the group.

Track listing

References

1996 compilation albums
The Specials compilation albums